The 1999–2000 campaign was the 94th season in Atlético Madrid's history and their 65th season in La Liga, the top division of Spanish football. It covers a period from 1 July 1999 to 30 June 2000.

First-team squad 
Squad at end of season

Left club during season

Transfers

In

Out

Loans out

Competitions

La Liga

League table

Position by round

Matches

Copa del Rey 

Third round

Eightfinals

Quarterfinals

Semifinals

Final

UEFA Cup 

First round

Second round

Third round

Quarter-finals

Statistics

Players statistics

References 

1999-2000
Spanish football clubs 1999–2000 season